Blyansk is a village in Gdovsky District of Pskov Oblast, Russia.

Rural localities in Pskov Oblast